Anthony Casey (born 1995) is an Irish Gaelic footballer who plays for Cork Senior Championship club Kiskeam and at inter-county level with the Cork senior football team. He usually lines out as a goalkeeper.

Honours

Kiskeam
Cork Premier Intermediate Football Championship (1): 2016

Cork
National Football League Division 3 (1): 2020
Munster Under-21 Football Championship (1): 2016

References

1995 births
Living people
Kiskeam Gaelic footballers
CIT Gaelic footballers
Cork inter-county Gaelic footballers
Gaelic football goalkeepers